W. Allen Pepper Jr. (July 20, 1941 – January 24, 2012) was a United States district judge of the United States District Court for the Northern District of Mississippi.

Education and career

Born in Greenwood, Mississippi, Pepper received a Bachelor of Arts degree from the University of Mississippi in 1963 and a Juris Doctor from the University of Mississippi School of Law in 1968. He was in private practice in Cleveland, Mississippi from 1968 to 1999.

Federal judicial service

On March 8, 1999, Pepper was nominated by President Bill Clinton to a seat on the United States District Court for the Northern District of Mississippi vacated by Lyonel Thomas Senter Jr. Pepper was confirmed by the United States Senate on June 30, 1999, and received his commission on July 7, 1999. His service was terminated on January 24, 2012, due to his death.

References

External links

1941 births
2012 deaths
Judges of the United States District Court for the Northern District of Mississippi
Mississippi lawyers
People from Greenwood, Mississippi
United States district court judges appointed by Bill Clinton
University of Mississippi alumni
University of Mississippi School of Law alumni
20th-century American judges
21st-century American judges